Alexander Wyclif Reed (7 March 1908 – 19 October 1979), also known as Clif Reed and A. W. Reed, was a prolific New Zealand publisher and author.

Biography
Alexander Wyclif Reed, along with his uncle Alfred Hamish Reed, established the publishing firm A. H. & A. W. Reed. He wrote more than 200 books and as an author was known most commonly as A. W. Reed. He was neither a scholar nor a gifted writer, but wrote commercially successful books based on simplifying and popularising secondary sources. Although he did not have firsthand knowledge of Māori language or custom, he wrote many books on the myths, language and place names of the Māori and, later, of Australian Aboriginal cultures.

Selected published works

References

External links
 Reed, Alexander Wyclif, Encyclopaedia of New Zealand 1966

New Zealand writers
1979 deaths
1908 births
Writers from Auckland